These are the results of the 2001 Central American and Caribbean Championships in Athletics which took place on July 20–22, 2001 in Guatemala City, Guatemala.

Estadio Mateo Flores, the host venue, is located at an altitude which is believed to affect the performance in some of the events.

Men's results

100 meters

Heats – July 20Wind:Heat 1: -0.7 m/s, Heat 2: -0.2 m/s, Heat 3: -0.9 m/s, Heat 4: +1.3 m/s

Semifinals – July 20Wind:Heat 1: -0.2 m/s, Heat 2: +0.7 m/s

Final – July 20Wind: -0.2 m/s

200 meters

Heats – July 20Wind:Heat 1: 0.0 m/s, Heat 2: +1.3 m/s, Heat 3: -0.3 m/s, Heat 4: 0.0 m/s

Semifinals – July 21Wind:Heat 1: +0.6 m/s, Heat 2: +1.9 m/s

Final – July 21Wind: -1.5 m/s

400 meters

Heats – July 20

Semifinals – July 20

Final – July 21

800 meters

Heats – July 21

Final – July 22

1500 meters
July 20

5000 meters
July 21

10,000 meters
July 20

Half marathon
July 22

110 meters hurdles

Heats – July 20Wind:Heat 1: 0.0 m/s, Heat 2: 0.0 m/s

Final – July 21Wind:-0.5 m/s

400 meters hurdles

Heats – July 21

Final – July 22

3000 meters steeplechase
July 22

4 x 100 meters relay

Heats – July 21

Final – July 22

4 x 400 meters relay
July 22

20 kilometers walk
July 22

High jump
July 22

Pole vault
July 20

Long jump
July 21

Triple jump
July 21

Shot put
July 21

Discus throw
July 20

Hammer throw
July 21

Javelin throw
July 20

Decathlon
July 20–21

Women's results

100 meters

Heats – July 20Wind:Heat 1: +0.9 m/s, Heat 2: -1.0 m/s, Heat 3: -1.2 m/s

Final – July 20Wind:-1.1 m/s

200 meters

Heats – July 21Wind:Heat 1: +0.4 m/s, Heat 2: +0.7 m/s

Final – July 21Wind:-0.4 m/s

400 meters
July 21

800 meters

Heats – July 21

Final – July 22

1500 meters
July 20

5000 meters
July 21

10,000 meters
July 20

Half marathon
July 21

100 meters hurdles
July 21Wind: -0.8 m/s

400 meters hurdles

Heats – July 21

Final – July 22

4 x 100 meters relay
July 22

4 x 400 meters relay
July 22

10 kilometers walk
July 20

High jump
July 20

Pole vault
July 22

Long jump
July 20

Triple jump
July 22

Shot put
July 22

Discus throw
July 22

Hammer throw
July 20

Javelin throw
July 20

Heptathlon
July 21–22

References

Central American and Caribbean Championships
Events at the Central American and Caribbean Championships in Athletics